Point Sur State Marine Reserve (SMR) and Point Sur State Marine Conservation Area (SMCA) are two adjoining marine protected areas that lie offshore of Point Sur, part of the Big Sur area on California's central coast. The SMR protects all marine life within its boundaries. Fishing and take of all living marine resources is prohibited. Within the SMCA fishing and take of all living marine resources is prohibited except the commercial and recreational take of salmon and albacore.

History

Point Sur SMR and Point Sur SMCA were established in September 2007 by the California Fish & Game Commission.  They are two of 29 marine protected areas adopted during the first phase of the Marine Life Protection Act Initiative.  The Marine Life Protection Act Initiative (or MLPAI) is a collaborative public process to create a statewide network of marine protected areas along the California coastline.

Geography and natural features

These two marine protected areas adjoin each other off the coast of Point Sur.  The Big Sur coastline is known for its spectacular and rugged scenery.  The sites are adjacent to Andrew Molera State Park and Point Sur State Historic Park.

Habitat and wildlife
The Point Sur marine protected areas contain a wide diversity of habitats that support a range of fish, seabird and invertebrate species.  The protected lee of Point Sur supports a large kelp bed that provides a shelter and nursery habitat to rockfish and other species. Remote from ports and from urban development, the Point Sur marine protected areas protect one of the few remaining areas in central California that support large, healthy fish populations and pristine habitat.

Recreation and nearby attractions
Andrew Molera State Park, adjacent to Point Sur SMR, has miles of hiking trails and a primitive walk-in camp. Point Sur State Historic Park features the Point Sur Lighthouse, the only complete turn-of-the century Lightstation open to the public in California.  The Lightstation is on the National Register of Historic Places.

California's marine protected areas encourage recreational and educational uses of the ocean.  Activities such as kayaking, diving, snorkeling, and swimming are allowed unless otherwise restricted.

Scientific monitoring
As specified by the Marine Life Protection Act, select marine protected areas along California's central coast are being monitored by scientists to track their effectiveness and learn more about ocean health. Similar studies in marine protected areas located off of the Santa Barbara Channel Islands have already detected gradual improvements in fish size and number.

Local scientific and educational institutions involved in the monitoring include Stanford University's Hopkins Marine Station, University of California Santa Cruz, Moss Landing Marine Laboratories and Cal Poly San Luis Obispo. Research methods include hook-and-line sampling, intertidal and scuba diver surveys, and the use of Remote Operated Vehicle (ROV) submarines.

References

External links
California MPAs
Marine Life Protection Act Initiative
CalOceans
Andrew Molera State Park
Point Sur State Historic Park
Big Sur Chamber of Commerce

Marine reserves of the United States
Protected areas of Monterey County, California
Protected areas established in 2007
2007 establishments in California
Big Sur